Margaret Johansen (4 April 1923 – 1 March 2013) was a Norwegian novelist.

She was born in Skien as a daughter of Olav Foss (1895–1941) and Astrid Marie Olsen (1886–1991). She was married twice, last to Olaf Andreas Johansen (1912–1985). She lived in Oslo from 1941.

Her bibliography of novels and short story collections include Om kvinner (1971), Men mannen ler (1973), Det var en gang en sommer (1974), Død og småsuppe (1976), Damenes vals (1978), Du kan da ikke bare gå (1981), Mandagsbarn (1984), Tidsfordriv (1988) and Coras krig (1991). Du kan da ikke bare gå was staged at Trøndelag Teater and performed in Fjernsynsteatret.

References

External links
  (1971–1988)

1923 births
2013 deaths
Norwegian women short story writers
Norwegian women novelists
People from Skien
Writers from Oslo
20th-century Norwegian novelists
20th-century Norwegian women writers
20th-century Norwegian short story writers